Writers in Paris in the 1920s refer to the American expatriate writers in Paris in the 1920s. They created literary works and movements that influence the global literary landscape to date. During the 1920s, political, economic, and social issues shaped the inspiration behind many of the writers in Paris. The American writers in Paris in the 1920s are referred to as the Lost Generation.

The Lost Generation 

Although the crisis of the post-world war context led to a decrease in cultural and artistic flare during the 1920s in Paris, the political, social and economic situation in France inspired the movement which was to be The Lost Generation (Les Années Folles) Although coined by Gertrude Stein, it was Ernest Hemingway who promulgated this term. The Lost Generation was a collectivised recognition of the aimlessness, confusion and grief experienced by the survivors and civilians of the war. In particular, the Lost Generation encompassed American expatriate writers in Paris within the 1920s. During the 1920s, Paris became the epicentre of culture, embracing extravagance, diversity and creativity. Artists such as F. Scott Fitzgerald, flocked from all over the world towards Paris, by this time the hotspot of expression and instrument of artistic direction. The Lost Generation all shared the post-war griefs of losing their loved ones, innocence and sense of pride. However, one thing that was most certainly not lost but in fact learned, was the sense of artistic expression characterised by the disillusionment and pessimism of the end of the First World War. Numerous Individuals became part of the Lost Generation without any recognition. However, the Lost Generation of the 1920s produced some of the most famous writers to date. Gertrude Stein grew to foster the creativity of the artists and writers of the Lost Generation, hosting frequent meetings of those who took part. Not only were writers such as Hemingway and Fitzgerald a part of this, but also world-renowned artists such as Pablo Picasso and Henri Mattisse.

Key writers

Ernest Hemingway (July 21, 1899 – July 2, 1961)

Ernest Hemingway, although an American-born writer, moved to Paris on the 22nd of December 1921. He embodied the experiences, cultural influences and literary styles and techniques of writers in the 1920s. Belonging to The Lost Generation, Hemingway contributed to some of the most important works of the 20th century. This would not have been possible without surrounding artists of the Lost Generation, such as Gertrude Stein, F. Scott Fitzgerald and Pablo Picasso, who proved to be central to his career. Within four years, Hemingway went from being an unknown individual to one of the most influential writers of the 20th century.

Gertrude Stein (3 February 1874 – 27 July 1946)

Gertrude Stein was an extremely influential member of French society in the 1920s. Having been an ambulance driver for the French during the first world war, her experiences characterised her artistic prowess and inspired her passion for self-expression. Stein established an artistic salon in her Paris apartment in which she would often host prominent artists and writers of Paris. Stein had a reciprocal relationship with those by whom she was surrounded. Such was exhibited in her adoption of the styles of Cubism and Abstraction within her writing, techniques derived from Pablo Picasso. The death of Stein's mother when she was just fourteen inspired her writing, one example being her work The Making of Americans (1925).

F. Scott Fitzgerald (24 September 1896 – 21 December 1940)
One of the most prominent figures of "The Lost Generation", Scott Fitzgerald is contemporarily referred to as one of the most influential American writers of the 20th century. Fitzgerald and his wife Zelda moved to Paris in the attempt to escape the financial woes and burdens endowed to them by the extravagance of their lifestyle in the previous years. This move proved to fuel Fitzgerald's literary prowess as he was bombarded with new ideas, cultural differences and a network of prominent artists.

Djuna Barnes (12 June 1892 – 18 June 1982)
Alongside prominent American Expatriate writers within Paris, Djuana Barnes was a significant illustrator, artist, and author to the literary landscape of the 1920s in Paris. As a product of her abusive childhood, Barnes' life was shaped around the desires of her father. The violence and trauma she endured as a child through instances such as rape and forcible marriage to her Father's mistress's brother, would go on to provide the impetus for inspiration and expression in her writing. Barnes' career, although loosely established prior to the 1920s, only flourished when she moved to Paris in 1921. Her experimental short stories referenced in Spillaway signified the beginning of her literary success in Paris. Barnes spiralled into alcoholic dependency and depression following her break up with Thelma Wood, whose infidelity and alcoholism tore apart their passionate relationship. One of Barnes' most famous works is Ladies Almanack, originally published in 1928, later developed into a film in 2017.

Kay Boyle (18 February 1901 – 27 December 1992)
Kay Boyle was an American expatriate writer, novelist and activist who moved to Paris in 1923 following the devastation bought to her family during the interwar period. Although she spent much of her childhood in Europe, she moved to Cincinnati with her family in due to financial problems faced by her family. Amongst the writers of the Lost Generation, Boyle was among the most profilific and her works have continued to have significance even after her death in 1992. Boyle was particularly acclaimed for her collection of Short Stories and referenced by film critic Ann Hornaday as a survivor of the "Halcon Days of Paris in the 1920s".

Notable literary works 

The literary works of writers in the 1920s in Paris would go on to influence a contemporary audience and have proven to remain relevant despite a significant cultural shift.

The Sun Also Rises (1926)

Hemingway's novel The Sun Also Rises (1926) summated life for writers in Paris throughout the 1920s. This novel re-evaluates themes such as the aimlessness of the Lost Generation, the concept of male insecurity, and, (as said by William Adair in his essay; "The Sun Also Rises; A Memory of War"), the destructiveness of sex. The ideas in this novel are so profound and provocative that it was banned in cities in the United States, as well as Nazi Germany for "being a monument of modern decadence".

The Waste Land (1922)

The Waste Land, by T.S. Eliot, is one of the most renowned poetic pieces to emerge from the 20th century. It is the cornerstone of Modernist writing. It includes the themes of war, disillusionment, trauma and death. It is a poem divided into five sections. It is a significant work which is devoted to the experiences of writers living in Paris in the 1920s, inspired by the loss of moral and cultural identity established by the backlash of World War One. The title is significant, a metaphor for the physical and psychological devastation experienced by Europe, and, particularly Paris in the mid-war period.

A Moveable Feast (1964) 
Although not written in the 1920s, one book which pays tribute to the sentiment within Paris in the 1920s is Ernest Hemingway's A Moveable Feast (1964). The novel focuses on the weather in Paris in the 1920s as a metaphor to encapsulate the disillusionment brought by the first World War. Like many works dedicated to Paris in the 1920s, this novel references Gertrude Stein's home at 27 Rue de Fleurs, the hub of literary collaboration and inspiration. 'A Moveable Feast' references the role Stein played as a mentor to Hemingway, a hugely influential entity to the artistic, particularly literary community within Paris in the 1920s.

The Autobiography of Alice B. Toklas (1933)

Gertrude Stein's work The Autobiography of Alice B. Toklas (1933) is rather an analysis of herself than the suggested subject, her partner Alice B.Toklas. It summarises her life before and during her move to Paris and the effects this had on her identity, writing and relationships. In particular, it is a comparison of life in pre-war California and post-war Paris in the 1920s. although published in 1933, it contextualises Paris in the 1920s, the commonly shared experience of an American expatriate within this time and the influences of 1920 Paris on not only her own but the art of all those who surrounded her, particularly members of "The Lost Generation".

Influences

Modernism
Alongside the labour shortages of the First World War, the emergence of technology and urbanisation, came the search for financial opportunities and the redefining of economics. As a response to this shift in perspective and values, Modernism emerged as a new movement of literary expression particularly catalysed by artists of the Lost Generation.

The Beat Generation 
The principles and key tenets first embodied by works of the Lost Generation in Paris in the 1920s included not only the expression of political disillusionment, but also a collective rejection of authoritarian values. Such a concept inspired the "Beat Generation" of the 1950s and 1960s, as the post- World War II era led to the rejection of conventional societies on behalf of artists in this time.

Contemporary films

Midnight in Paris (2011) 
The immense influence of Writers in Paris in the 1920s on subsequent literature Is effectively captured in award winning works. Woody Allen's 2011 film, Midnight in Paris, is inspired by literary works produced in Paris in the 1920s such as Hemingway's A Moveable Feast. It pays homage to the literary landscape in Paris in the 1920s and references writers of this period such as Gertrude Stein, F. Scott Fitzgerald, and Zelda Fitzgerald.

Z: the beginning of everything (2015) 
The legacies of both F. Scott and Zelda Fitzgerald remain highly significant in contemporary society. The Television series, Z: The beginning of everything, that spanned from 2015-2017, is a fictional biography which follows the early life of both F. Scott Fitzgerald and Zelda Fitzgerald, and what would result in their turbulent love affair. It follows the life of writers in Paris in the 1920s, the close associates of the Fitzgeralds, and what it meant to experience the tensions of a War ridden society first-hand.

The Making of Americans (1925) 
The Making of Americans is a novel which was officially published in 1925 by Gertrude Stein. Although set in a fictional world, its plot mimics her own personal experiences of immigration in the interwar period. The novel entails repetition as its main technique and a limited use of vocabulary. It has been the centre of literary conversation until present. It is widely criticised as "lacking in form, consistency and coherency".

References

Writers from Paris
American writers